Excision repair cross-complementing (ERCC) is a set of proteins which are involved in DNA repair.

In humans, ERCC proteins are transcribed from the following genes:

ERCC1, ERCC2, ERCC3, ERCC4, ERCC5, ERCC6, and ERCC8.

Members 1 though 5 are associated with Xeroderma Pigmentosum.

Members 6 and 8 are associated with Cockayne syndrome.

References 

DNA repair